Masr may refer to:
 Egypt, "Masr" is the name for Egypt in Egyptian Arabic.
 Masr, Iran, a village in Isfahan Province, Iran.

See also
 Masar (disambiguation)